Gunn is a female Norwegian given name. Notable people with the name include:

 Gunn Berit Gjerde (born 1954), Norwegian politician
 Gunn Imsen (born 1946), Norwegian professor
 Gunn Karin Gjul (born 1967), Norwegian politician
 Gunn Marit Helgesen (born 1958), Norwegian politician
 Gunn Olsen (1952–2013), Norwegian politician

Norwegian feminine given names